Jamón is a popular Spanish dry-cured ham.

Jamon may also refer to:

 Jamon Brown (born 1993), American football player
 Jamon Gordon (born 1984), American basketball player
 Jamon Meredith (born 1986), American football player
 Jamón Jamón, a 1992 Spanish comedy/drama film